Flipkart Health+ (formerly known as SastaSundar Healthbuddy Limited), is a e-commerce platform dealing in healthcare, online pharmacy, diagnostics and e-consultation in India.

The company was co-founded in 2013, by Banwari Lal Mittal and Ravi Kant Sharma with the name SastaSundar Healthbuddy in Kolkata.

On 1 April 2022 Flipkart acquired a majority stake in SastaSundar making it a Walmart-owned company.

Flipkart health+ appoints Prashant Jhaveri as CEO on March 15, 2022.

History 

SastaSundar Healthbuddy Limited, started as an online pharmacy in 2013. The company is based out of Kolkata, India.

The company is a subsidiary of SastaSundar Ventures Limited, established in 2014. The company has more than 200 stores in India.

Funding 

In May 2017, SastaSundar received ₹33.4 crore funding from Japan-based pharmaceutical company Rohto Pharmaceutical.

In Aug 2019, Mitsubishi Corporation invested ₹100 crore in the company.

In November 2021, Flipkart Health acquired Sastasundar Healthbuddy for undisclosed sum.

References 

Online pharmacies
Health care companies established in 2013
Indian companies established in 2013
Health care companies of India
Companies listed on the National Stock Exchange of India
Companies listed on the Bombay Stock Exchange